Hyporhamphus australis is a halfbeak garfish from the family Hemiramphidae. It is found in Australian waters. Also recorded at Lord Howe Island and Norfolk Island.

References

australis
Fish described in 1866
Fish of Australia